Pope Demetrius may refer to:

 Pope Demetrius I of Alexandria, ruled in 189–232
 Pope Demetrius II of Alexandria, ruled in 1861–1870